Smithland is a home rule-class city in Livingston County, Kentucky, United States, at the confluence of the Ohio and Cumberland Rivers. The population was 301 at the 2010 census, a drop from 401 in 2000. It is the county seat of Livingston County.

Smithland is part of the Paducah, KY-IL Micropolitan Statistical Area.

Historic sites
The Gower House built in about 1780 is located in Smithland.  It was listed on the National Register of Historic Places in 1973.
It was built as an inn for travelers, on the south bank of the confluence of the Cumberland and Ohio rivers.

The Richard Olive House built in about 1841 is also located in Smithland.

Geography

Demographics

As of the census of 2000, there were 401 people, 157 households, and 105 families residing in the city. The racial makeup of the city was 98.75% White, 0.25% African American, 0.75% from other races, and 0.25% from two or more races. Hispanic or Latino of any race were 0.75% of the population.

There were 157 households, out of which 24.2% had children under the age of 18 living with them, 50.3% were married couples living together, 12.7% had a female householder with no husband present, and 33.1% were non-families. 28.7% of all households were made up of individuals, and 15.9% had someone living alone who was 65 years of age or older. The average household size was 2.22 and the average family size was 2.72.

In the city, the population was spread out, with 16.0% under the age of 18, 7.0% from 18 to 24, 25.7% from 25 to 44, 23.9% from 45 to 64, and 27.4% who were 65 years of age or older. The median age was 46 years. For every 100 females, there were 91.0 males. For every 100 females age 18 and over, there were 95.9 males.

The median income for a household in the city was $30,000, and the median income for a family was $40,568. Males had a median income of $28,281 versus $16,167 for females. The per capita income for the city was $16,751. About 7.1% of families and 9.0% of the population were below the poverty line, including 7.7% of those under age 18 and 12.0% of those age 65 or over.

Education
Public education in Smithland is administered by Livingston County Schools, which operates Livingston Central High School.

Smithland has a lending library, the Livingston County Public Library.

Notable people
Carter W. Clarke U.S. Army General who oversaw the post-war investigation in the intelligence around the Pearl Harbor Attack.

See also
 List of cities and towns along the Ohio River

References

Cities in Livingston County, Kentucky
County seats in Kentucky
Kentucky populated places on the Ohio River
Cities in Kentucky